, (born February 20, 1964, in Sendai in Miyagi Prefecture), is a Japanese singer-songwriter. She made her nationwide debut at the age of 6 on the TV program Chibikko Nodojiman, which she recited the Takibi nursery rhyme. Shortly after graduating college, she recorded a demo, and signed to Epic/Sony Records in 1987, which officially began her music career. Although she has since had a very prolific career, Yusa became popular for her song "Kuro", which was featured on the NHK television program Minna no Uta from December 2005 until January 2006. She was also in the mid-1990s supergroup Love, Peace & Trance, which also featured Mishio Ogawa, Miyako Koda from Dip in the Pool and Haruomi Hosono as the producer, composer and songwriter.

Discography

Albums

Source:
 
 
 
 Hope
 
 
 Momoism
 
 
 
 Roka
 Echo
 Mimomemo: The Memorable Songs of Mimori Yusa
 
 Small is Beautiful
 Honoka　()
 Still Life　
 
 Travelogue Sweet and Bitter Collection
 Bougainvillea
 Bougainvillea Reflect
 Breath at the Show
 
 
 
 Mimori yusa concert 2009/銀河手帖
 Do-Re-Mimo ～the singles collection～
 
 Violetta: The Best of 25 Years
 piano album

Singles
Source:

 
 
 
 
 
 "Silent Bells"
 
 
 
 "One"
 
 
 "Grace"
 
 
 
 
 
 
 
 
 
 
 
 
  
 
 
 
 "I'll Remember"
 "Light Song" 
 
 "I'm here with you"
 

References

External links
  
 Mimori Yusa at Oricon 
Hidamari – Unofficial Site
Mimori Yusa at MusicBrainz
[ Mimori Yusa discography at Allmusic.com]

1964 births
Living people
People from Sendai
Japanese women singers
Musicians from Miyagi Prefecture
Kunitachi College of Music alumni